Pierre Auguste Lajard (20 April 1757 in Montpellier – 12 June 1837 in Paris) was a Minister of War during the French Revolution.

References

1757 births
1837 deaths
Politicians from Montpellier
Secretaries of State for War (France)
18th-century French politicians